Ganu or Genow or Ganoo may refer to:
 Ganu, Golestan l
 Genow, Hormozgan
 Terengganu, a Malaysian state
Si può usare anche in  scarabeo